Jan Zborowski (19 December 1538 – 25 August 1603 in Odolanów) was a Polish Court Hetman of the Crown, royal secretary of king Sigismund II Augustus and Lord Castellan of Gniezno (since 1576).

Zborowski was a Lutheran and fought in the Danzig rebellion. He was a supporter of the Warsaw Confederation and an opponent of the Sandomierz Agreement.

See also
Zborowski family

References

 
 

1538 births
1603 deaths
Polish Lutherans
Jan Zborowski